Steede is a surname common in Bermuda. Notable people with the name include:

Albert Steede (born 1968), Bermudian cricketer
Kwame Steede (born 1980), Bermudian footballer
London Steede-Jackson (born 1994), Bermudian footballer
Ottis Steede (born 1974), Bermudian footballer
Ryan Steede (born 1975), Bermudian cricketer
Tumaini Steede (1990–2012), Bermudian footballer